Viktor Weber Edler von Webenau (* 13 November 1861 in Neuhaus; † 6 May 1932 in Innsbruck), General in the Austro-Hungarian Army during World War I, military governor of Montenegro between 1916 and 1917 and head of the Austro-Hungarian armistice commission (Armistice of villa Giusti.)

Biography

Career 

1879:  as Kadett-Offizierstellvertreter from Infanteriekadettenschule Liebenau to Feldjägerbataillon 27
1 November 1880: Lieutenant, General staff branch
1 May 1911: Major General and commander 4th Mountain Brigade
25 April 1914: Supreme Military Court
1 July 1914: Vice-President of SMC
1 August 1914: Feldmarschalleutnant
9 April 1915: Commander 47. Infanterie Division
26 February 1916: Military Governor of Montenegro
10 July 1917: Commander X. Corps
1 November 1917: General der Infanterie
7 February 1918: Commander of all mobile troops in the districts of Vienna, Kraków, Lemberg
15 May 1918: Commander XVIII. Corps
July 1918: Commander VI. Corps
27 October - 3 November 1918: Chief of the "Waffenstillstandskommission" with Italy

Family 

Viktor Weber Edler von Webenau was married two times:
 1886 - 1900: Therese, née Baumgartner
 1901 - 1932: Anna, née Hebenstreit

Children 

 Guido Weber-Webenau (Dr. phil.), (* 13 September 1887 in Tarvis; † ?)
 Norbert Weber von Webenau, (* 7 July 1886 in Tarvis; † 26 August 1914 killed in action in Galicia)

Decorations (selection) 

 Knight's Cross of the Military Maria Theresia Order
 Grand Cross of the Franz Joseph Order with War Decoration
 Military Merit Cross 2nd Class with War Decoration and Swords
 Order of the Iron Crown 2nd Class with War Decoration and Swords
 Officer's Cross of the Franz Joseph Order
 Honour Insignia 1st Class of the Austrian Red Cross
 Military Merit Cross 3rd Class
 Bronze Military Merit Medal with War Decoration (Signum Laudis)
 Service Badge for Officers 2nd Class
 Military Jubilee Medal 1898
 Military Jubilee Cross 1908
 Mobilization Cross of 1912/13
 Prussian Iron Cross 1st and 2nd Class
 Ottoman Iron Crescent

He was additionally appointed a Geheimer Rat (Privy Councillor) of Austria-Hungary.

Rank 

1 November 1880: Leutnant
1 May 1886: Oberleutnant
1 October 1893: Hauptmann 2. Klasse
1 November 1895: Hauptmann 1. Klasse
1 November 1898: Major
1 May 1902: Oberstleutnant
1 May 1905: Oberst
2 May 1911: Generalmajor
8 August 1914: Feldmarschalleutnant
17 November 1917: General der Infanterie

References

External links

 Austrian Commanders

1861 births
1932 deaths
People from Völkermarkt District
Edlers of Austria
Austro-Hungarian military personnel of World War I
Austro-Hungarian generals
Knights Cross of the Military Order of Maria Theresa